Alculympics, founded in 2009, is a sports league and triennial multi-sport event involving participants from the current 18  member schools of the Association of Local Colleges and Universities in the Philippines.

The five-day tournament has 14 sports events, including volleyball, basketball, table tennis, taekwondo, arnis, and track and field. One of the highlights of this event is the search for "Miss Alculympics".

The first Alculympics was hosted from January 19 to 23, 2009 by the Pamantasan ng Lungsod ng Marikina at the Marikina Sports Center, with the theme "Towards a Dynamic Culture of Sportsmanship."

The third Alculympics was hosted from March 6 to 11, 2011 at Calapan City, Oriental Mindoro.

Member schools

Metro Manila

Editions and results

References

Recurring sporting events established in 2009
Student sport in the Philippines
Local colleges and universities in the Philippines